Little Horton is a ward in the metropolitan borough of the City of Bradford, West Yorkshire, England.  It contains eight listed buildings that are recorded in the National Heritage List for England.  All the listed buildings are designated at Grade II, the lowest of the three grades, which is applied to "buildings of national importance and special interest".  The ward is to the southwest of the centre of Bradford, and is residential.  All the listed buildings are sandstone cottages dating from the first half of the 19th century.


Buildings

References

Citations

Sources

Lists of listed buildings in West Yorkshire
Listed